Wolfdale may refer to:
 Wolfdale, Iowa
 Wolfdale, Pennsylvania
 Wolfdale (microprocessor), processor manufactured by Intel